The IBM Kanji System was announced in 1971 to support Japanese language processing on the IBM System/360 computers. It was later enhanced by the support of IBM System/34, IBM 5550 and DOS/V.

General
The IBM Kanji System became available in a series of staged announcements. Its initial technical demonstration was done at Expo '70 in Osaka, and an official announcement was made in 1971, including:
 IBM 2245 Kanji Printer
 IBM 5924 Kanji Keypunch
 IBM System/360-System/370 OS/VS1 & DOS/VSE Programming support

The Kanji Keypunch was able to punch up to 2950 kinds of Kanji characters, using the left hand to select one of the 15 shift keys and the right hand to select one of the 240 Kanji characters for each shift. Until that time, only English alphanumeric and Japanese half-width Katakana characters were processed on IBM mainframes. The IBM Kanji System thus established the basis for handling up to about 10,000 Japanese characters used in the daily life.

The IBM Kanji System was further enhanced in September 1979 to include:

Hardware
 Offline input/output
 IBM 5924 T01 Kanji Keypunch (IBM 029 Key Punch with 12-shift key Kanji keyboard) - RPQ
 Online terminals
 IBM 3270 Subsystem
 IBM 3274 model 52C Control Unit with Kanji processing functions
 IBM 3278 model 52 Display (IBM 3278 Display with 12-shift key Kanji keyboard)
 IBM 3283 model 52 Inkjet Printer
 Online printer
 IBM 3800-2 Printing Subsystem

Kanji support software
 Operating Systems
 OS/VS1
 DOS/VSE
 IBM 8100 DPPX
 Development Languages
 COBOL
 PL/I
 DBCS support
 IMS
 CICS
 Utility programs

The IBM Kanji System was planned, designed, and implemented mainly by Double-byte Technical Coordination Organization (DTCO) and development departments in IBM Fujisawa Laboratory, assisted by IBM Endicott Lab (IBM 029), Poughkeepsie Lab (OS/VS), Kingston Lab (IBM 3270), Santa Teresa Lab (IMS), Hursley Lab (CICS), Boeblingen Lab (DOS/VSE) and other locations as well as related vendors.

These announcements were followed by other announcements:
 IBM System/34 Kanji System, using IBM 5250 display (October, 1979)
 IBM 3283-053 Kanji Printer (1981)
 IBM 3200 Kanji Printer (1982)
 IBM 3270 emulation and IBM 5250 emulation by the Japanese PCs:
 IBM 5550 (1984)
 DOS/V (1991)

Competition and cooperation

At the time of its development, Japan's major mainframe companies were developing their own Japanese processing systems independently and at the same time cooperating to establish a Japanese character code industry standard (JIS X 0208). Some of these systems are:
 JEF (Japanese processing Extended Facility) by Fujitsu
 JIPS (Japanese Information Processing System) by NEC
 KEIS (Kanji processing Extended Information System) by Hitachi

Effect to the support of other languages
Similar supports later became available for Korean, and Chinese (both in Traditional and Simplified forms).

References

See also
 Japanese language
 Kanji
 DBCS
 CJK characters
 List of IBM products
 IBM 2245
 IBM 5924

Encodings of Japanese
Kanji
Computer-related introductions in 1971
1971 establishments in Japan